Helsingin Uimarit (HU) is a non-profit swimming club operating in Helsinki, Finland. HU was established in 1916. Today, there are more than 300 members taking part in HU:s swimming groups and -schools. HU has won the award for the best club in Finnish championships in swimming 28 times in a row. Activities such as racing, skating, and water polo exist within the school.

History
Founded in 1916, the Helsinki Swimmers was the only available pool for Helsinki swimming activities. Since the establishment, 427 Finnish Championships have been won by the club.

References

External links 
 Helsingin Uimarit

Swimming in Finland
Sports clubs in Finland